Tamaš Kajdoči (born ) is a Serbian male weightlifter who is competing in the +109 kg category and represents Serbia in international competitions. As a junior, he won the silver medal at the 2014 Summer Youth Olympics.

Major results

References

1997 births
Living people
Serbian male weightlifters
Sportspeople from Subotica
Hungarians in Vojvodina
Weightlifters at the 2014 Summer Youth Olympics